Worth Harrington Bagley (July 29, 1924 – October 9, 2016) was a four star admiral in the United States Navy who served as Commander in Chief United States Naval Forces Europe from 1973 to 1974 and Vice Chief of Naval Operations from 1974 to 1975. He was born in Annapolis, Maryland and died in La Jolla, California.

References

1924 births
2016 deaths
United States Navy admirals
United States Naval Academy alumni
Vice Chiefs of Naval Operations
People from Annapolis, Maryland
Recipients of the Navy Distinguished Service Medal
Recipients of the Legion of Merit